Delmas is a commune in the Port-au-Prince Arrondissement, in the Ouest department of Haiti. Delmas itself is an urban continuation of the capital city. Delmas is also the location of much of the area's commercial and industrial enterprise.

Delmas is traversed by two major roadways. Autoroute de Delmas runs from Route National No. 1 in the northwest corner of the commune to Pétion-Ville on the southeast corner. Boulevard de Toussaint Louverture runs from Autoroute de Delmas to the Toussaint Louverture International Airport and beyond to the commune of Tabarre. Autoroute de Delmas is flanked on both sides by local roads. These roads are numbered, with odd numbers on the north side and even numbers on the south side. For each road, the number is preceded by "Delmas," such as Delmas 60, Delmas 19, etc. Several of these roads are significant and may have other names. Delmas 30B is more commonly known as Rue Nazon and connects Delmas to Port-au-Prince on the south. Delmas 33 connects Delmas to Tabarre on the north. The areas adjacent to Autoroute de Delmas are primarily commercial and residential. Boulevard de Toussaint Louverture leads through the industrial portion of the commune.

History 
Subsequent to the 2003 Census, the area of Delmas commune was significantly reduced by the creation of two new communes - Cité Soleil and Tabarre - substantively carved out of the area of the former Delmas. In 2009, the residual Delmas commune had an area of 27.74 km2, and an estimated population of 359,451.

Delmas was affected by the 12 January 2010 earthquake. On 1 February 2010, electricity was restored for streetlighting in Delmas.

Lower Delmas is believed to be the stronghold of Jimmy "Barbecue" Chérizier, whose G9 Family and Allies gang controls most of Lower Delmas.

Economics 
Delmas has become the richest commune in Haiti. Its tax revenue has increased to more than 400,000,000 gourdes, which is about US$8,000,000.

Education
 

Centre Pédagogique des Frères Unis

References

Port-au-Prince
Populated places in Ouest (department)
Communes of Haiti